The Southern Legends Association along with its subsidiaries is a diversified non-profit entertainment company with operations in four business segments, Hall of Fame inductions, artist promotions, musical recordings and various entertainment operations. It was founded in 2005 by Widmarc Clark, Jimmy Case, H. T. "Hank" Henry and Mark Cavaliero. The home office of operation is located in Portland, Tennessee. Public relations, promotion photography and creative art design is done in Cantonment, Florida.  Media networking is done from McAlpin, Florida. The website technical work is done in Raleigh, North Carolina, where everything is prepared for presentation on  the Hall of Fame website. Musical recording and/or other entertainment operations are done at the home office in Portland, Tennessee. The Southern Legends Hall Of Fame has been recognized by the Country Music Hall of Fame and Museum.

Founding members
Widmarc Clark
Jimmy Case
H.T. " Hank " Henry
Mark Cavaliero

Hall Of Fame inductees

2005
Jimmy Case
Dale Hawkins
Ray Sharpe
Scotty Moore
D.J. Fontana
Vernon Taylor
Lazy Lester
Matt Lucas
Phil Phillips
Barbara Lynn
Johnny Leen
Jay Shankle
The Hubcaps
George Klein
Ronnie Kaye
Francis Gosman
Shorty Horton
Gary Carter
Tammy Leen
John Rhys
Charlie Musselwhite
Don Helms
Lamar Morris
J.W. Whitten
Sanford Clark
Gene Summers
Jerry Lee Lewis
James Burton
Jim McCoy
Travis Wammack
Billy Lee Riley
The Seldom Seen
Tom "Cat" Reeder
Ace Cannon
Conway Twitty
Bill Mack (Blue Caps)
Billy Joe Shaver
Elvis Presley
Frankie Ford
Joe Bennett and The Sparkletones
Ronnie Hawkins
Ronnie McDowell
Roy Irvin
Narvel Felts
Bobby Stephenson

2006
Alex Ward
The Blind Boys of Alabama
Fisher Hendley
The Jordanaires
Red Steagall
Hank Henry
Gary "Catfish" Hightower
Barney Barnwell
Fayssoux Starling McClean
Gordon Terry
Loretta Lynn
Lonnie Mack
Billy Swan
Bob Wood
John Wesley Ryles
Rattlesnake Annie
Roland Janes

 2007
Tony Douglas
Larry Stephenson
Eddie Stubbs

References

External links
Southern Legends HOF website
BluePower Radio
Country Music Hall of Fame and Museum
Archive News & Reviews
CD Baby

Culture of the Southern United States
American country music
Music halls of fame
Halls of fame in Tennessee
Awards established in 2005